IFK Strängnäs is a sports club in Strängnäs, Sweden, established in 1899. The club runs track and field athletics, handball, disabled sports, orienteering, earlier even bandy. The men's bandy team played in the Swedish top division in 1931 and 1932.

History
In the first year of bandy league system in Sweden, 1930–31, IFK Strängnäs entered in Division 1 Södra together with
Djurgårdens IF, IF Göta, IFK Uppsala, IK Göta, Linköpings AIK, Nässjö IF, and Örebro SK and finished 6th.

References

External links
Official website 

1899 establishments in Sweden
Defunct bandy clubs in Sweden
Parasports teams
Orienteering clubs in Sweden
Sport in Strängnäs
Bandy clubs established in 1899
Handball clubs established in 1899
Swedish handball clubs
Multi-sport clubs in Sweden